Islam has only a slight presence in the Channel Island of Guernsey, a British Crown dependency. A 2005 BBC interview with a local Muslim man noted "a few dozen" practitioners and no mosque or meeting-place.

References

External links
 

Guernsey
Religion in Guernsey